Cars 2 is a 2011 American computer-animated spy comedy film produced by Pixar Animation Studios for Walt Disney Pictures. It is the sequel to Cars (2006), the second film in the Cars franchise, and the 12th animated film from the studio. The film was directed by John Lasseter (in his final outing as director of a Pixar film to date), co-directed by Brad Lewis, and produced by Denise Ream, from a screenplay written by Ben Queen, and a story by Lasseter, Lewis, and Dan Fogelman. In the film's ensemble voice cast, Owen Wilson, Larry the Cable Guy, Tony Shalhoub, Guido Quaroni, Bonnie Hunt, and John Ratzenberger reprise their roles from the first film. Paul Newman, who voiced Doc Hudson in the previous film, died in September 2008, so his character was written out of the film; George Carlin, who previously voiced Fillmore, died during the same year, and his role was passed to Lloyd Sherr. The returning cast is joined by Michael Caine, Emily Mortimer, John Turturro, Eddie Izzard, and Thomas Kretschmann, who voice the new characters introduced in this film.

The film follows race car Lightning McQueen (Wilson) and tow truck Mater (Cable Guy), who head to Japan and Europe to compete in the World Grand Prix, but Mater accidentally becomes sidetracked with international espionage, and ends up attempting to uncover a conspiracy led by a mysterious criminal mastermind and his gang which threatens all competitors in the Grand Prix, with the help of British spies Finn McMissile (Caine) and Holley Shiftwell (Mortimer).

Cars 2 was first announced in April 2008 with a tentative 2012 release date, making Cars the second Pixar film to spawn a sequel after Toy Story, as well as becoming a franchise. Lasseter was confirmed to be returning as director, while Lewis was designated as co-director in June 2010. The film's story was conceived by Lasseter while he was traveling around the world promoting the first film. Michael Giacchino composed the film's score, with artists such as Weezer, Robbie Williams, Brad Paisley and Bénabar contributing tracks for the film. This was the final Pixar film animated with their old software system, Marionette, before being officially replaced with Presto in 2012. 

Cars 2 premiered at the El Capitan Theatre in Los Angeles on June 18, 2011, and was released in the United States on June 24, in Disney Digital 3D and IMAX 3D as well as traditional two-dimensional and IMAX formats. Though Cars 2 received mixed reviews from critics, it continued the studio's streak of box office success, grossing over $559 million worldwide against a $200 million budget, becoming the tenth highest-grossing film of 2011 and the highest-grossing film of the Cars trilogy. The film was nominated for Best Animated Feature Film at the 69th Golden Globe Awards, but lost to The Adventures of Tintin. A sequel, Cars 3, was released on June 16, 2017.

Plot

British spy Finn McMissile infiltrates an oil rig owned by a group of criminal lemon cars to rescue fellow spy Leland Turbo, who has blown his own cover. He witnesses the lemons, seemingly led by German weapons designer and scientist Professor Zündapp, load an electromagnetic pulse generator, disguised as a TV camera onto a shipping crate. After discovering Turbo's death, a burst of flames reveals his presence to the lemons, and he escapes by faking his death.

After winning his fourth Piston Cup, Lightning McQueen returns to Radiator Springs to spend his off-season with his friends. However, Italian formula race car Francesco Bernoulli challenges Lightning to take part in the World Grand Prix, an international three-race event created by former oil tycoon Sir Miles Axlerod, who intends to promote his new environmentally friendly fuel, Allinol, and invites race cars from around the world to compete. Lightning and his best friend Mater — along with Luigi, Guido, Fillmore, and Sarge — depart for Tokyo for the first race of the World Grand Prix.

At a World Grand Prix promotional party event, Mater makes a scene after eating a bowl of wasabi and seemingly leaking on stage, embarrassing Lightning in front of everyone. While cleaning up, Mater interrupts a fight between American spy Rod "Torque" Redline and crimimal lemon cars Grem and Acer. Redline plants his tracking device on Mater, causing the spy Finn McMissile and his associate Holley Shiftwell to mistake him for the spy. Meanwhile, Redline is captured and killed by criminal lemon professor Zündapp, who reveals that Allinol is set on fire when hit with an EMP. He informs his superior, an unknown mastermind, that Redline passed on his information. Holley finds and recruits Mater to stop Zündapp's plot.

At the race, three racers are ignited by the camera, making their engines explode. Lightning places second in the race after Bernoulli, due to miscommunication with Mater, who was evading Zündapp's henchmen with help from Holley and Finn. Lightning angrily snaps at Mater, who then goes to the airport to return to Radiator Springs, but is abducted by Finn as the lemons close onto both, and they flee in Finn's jet, Siddeley. After traveling to Paris to gather intel from Finn's old friend and underground informant Tomber, they head to Porto Corsa, Italy, where the second race is being held. During the race, Mater infiltrates the lemons' meeting, just as a few racers are flamed out by the camera, causing a multi-car pile-up, while Lightning wins. Due to controversy and increased fears over Allinol's safety, Axlerod lifts the requirement to use it for the final race in London. However, when Lightning decides to continue using it, the lemons plan to kill him in the race. Frightened that his best friend is in danger, Mater accidentally blows his cover, causing him, Finn, and Holley to be captured and tied up inside Big Bentley, where he admits to them that he is not the spy they think he is.

When the race starts, Lightning takes the lead before passing Big Bentley, however, the camera was inexplicably defective on him. The lemons tell Mater they planted a time bomb in Lightning's pits as a backup plan, spurring him to break free and escape. Finn and Holley escape soon after but realize that the bomb was fitted on Mater's air filter when they were passed out, as the lemons predicted that Mater would easily escape to help Lightning. Mater had already arrived at the pits when they tell him this, so he flees down the track while Lightning chases after him to apologize for his outburst in Tokyo. Finn apprehends Zündapp when he attempts to escape. The other lemons arrive and outnumber Finn, Holley, Mater, and Lightning, but they are soon rescued by the other Radiator Springs residents and Sarge's colleagues in the British Army. Mater and Lightning go to Buckingham Palace, where Mater exposes Axlerod as the mastermind behind the plot, which is proven after Axelrod is forced to disable the bomb. It is then revealed that the World Grand Prix was a cover-up by Axelrod to turn the world against Allinol and other alternative fuels, and he was also the one who leaked oil in Tokyo, for which Mater was blamed. After Axlerod and the lemons are arrested by the police, Mater receives an honorary knighthood from the Queen, and he and Lightning reconcile.

Back in Radiator Springs, Mater tells everyone there about his espionage experience, as Finn and Holley stop over. Fillmore reveals that Sarge had swapped Allinol with his organic fuel prior to the start of the World Grand Prix, which explains the camera's ineffectiveness on Lightning during the London race. A "Radiator Springs Grand Prix" is held, featuring all the World Grand Prix contenders. Mater declines an invitation from Finn and Holley to go on another mission, choosing to stay in Radiator Springs. While his weapons get confiscated, he gets to keep the rockets and catches up to Lightning, who speeds off with Mater behind him, just as Siddeley speeds into the distance.

Voice cast

Much of the cast from the original Cars returned for the sequel, but three voice actors of the original film have died since its release. Joe Ranft (who voiced Red) died in an automobile accident on August 16, 2005, ten months before Cars (which was dedicated in memorial to him) was released, and therefore Red played no vocal role in the film. George Carlin (who voiced Fillmore) died of heart failure on June 22, 2008, so Fillmore was voiced by Lloyd Sherr (who also voices Tony Trihull). Paul Newman (who voiced Doc Hudson) died of cancer on September 26, 2008. After Newman's death, Lasseter said they would "see how the story goes with Doc Hudson." Doc was eventually dropped, and implied to have died a few years before the events of Cars 2.

 Larry the Cable Guy as Mater, a Southern-accented tow truck from Radiator Springs who becomes sidetracked with espionage.
 Owen Wilson as Lightning McQueen, a Piston Cup racecar.
 Michael Caine as Finn McMissile, a British spy car who, alongside Holley, helps Mater to foil the criminals.
 Emily Mortimer as Holley Shiftwell, a beautiful young British desk agent, new to field work who is Finn's assistant. 
 John Turturro as Francesco Bernoulli, McQueen's main racing rival from Italy.
 Eddie Izzard as Sir Miles Axlerod, a British "electric" car who created Allinol and the World Grand Prix. He is later revealed to be the mastermind behind the evil organization the Lemons.
 Thomas Kretschmann as Professor Zündapp, the doctor scientist from Germany, Axlerod's assistant who plans to sabotage the World Grand Prix. Kretschmann reprised the role in the German dubbing of the movie.
 Joe Mantegna and Peter Jacobson as Grem and Acer, Professor Zündapp's henchmen.
 Bruce Campbell as Rod "Torque" Redline, an American spy car.
 Tony Shalhoub as Luigi
 Darrell Waltrip as Darrell Cartrip
 Guido Quaroni as Guido
 Brent Musburger as Brent Mustangburger
 Jason Isaacs as:
 Siddeley, an Gulfstream V spy jet.
 Leland Turbo, a British agent car who sent the video message to Finn and is crushed into a cube by lemons.
 David Hobbs as David Hobbscap. Jacques Villeneuve voiced the character in the French dubbing of the movie.
 Stanley Townsend as:
Vladimir Trunkov
Ivan
Victor Hugo
 Lloyd Sherr as:
 Fillmore
 Tony Trihull, a combat ship.
 Paul Dooley as Sarge
 Michel Michelis as Tomber
 Sig Hansen as Crabby the Boat
 Franco Nero as Uncle Topolino. Nero reprised the role in the Italian dubbing of the movie.
 Vanessa Redgrave as:
Mama Topolino. In the Italian dubbing of the movie, Sophia Loren voiced Mama Topolino.
The Queen. Redgrave reprised the role in the Italian dubbing of the movie.
 Bonnie Hunt as Sally Carrera
 Cheech Marin as Ramone
 Jenifer Lewis as Flo
 Michael Wallis as Sheriff
 Katherine Helmond as Lizzie
 John Ratzenberger as Mack
 Jeff Garlin as Otis
 Patrick Walker as Mel Dorado
 Lewis Hamilton as Lewis Hamilton
 Velibor Topic as Alexander Hugo
 John Mainier as J. Curby Gremlin
 Brad Lewis as Tubbs Pacer
 Richard Kind as Van
 Edie McClurg as Minny
 Teresa Gallagher as Mater's computer
 Jeff Gordon as Jeff Gorvette
 John Lasseter as John Lassetire

In international versions of the film, the character Jeff Gorvette is replaced with race car drivers better known in the specific countries in his dialogue scenes (however, he still appears as a competitor).
 Mark Winterbottom as Frosty (Australian release)
 Fernando Alonso as Fernando Alonso (Spanish release)
 Vitaly Petrov as Vitaly Petrov (Russian release)
 Jan Nilsson as Flash (Swedish release)
 Memo Rojas (Latin American release)
 Sebastian Vettel as Sebastian Schnell (German release)

In Brazil, Gorvette is replaced by Carla Veloso in his dialogue scenes (Carla appears in all other versions of the film, but with no lines); Carla is voiced by Brazilian singer Claudia Leitte. Sportspeople still appear, with Lewis Hamilton becoming Formula One champion Emerson Fittipaldi, while Brent Mustangburger and David Hobbscap were done by sports announcers José Trajano and Luciano do Valle.

Production

Development

Cars is the second Pixar film, after Toy Story, to have a sequel as well as becoming a franchise. John Lasseter, the director of the film, stated that he conceived the sequel's story while traveling around the world promoting the first film. He said:

In April 2008, Pixar unveiled its latest animation slate, with Cars 2 scheduled for a summer 2012 release. Brad Lewis, who had served as producer on Ratatouille, was announced as the film's director. In June 2010, it was announced that Lasseter had been designated as co-director.

In 2009, Disney registered several domain names, hinting to audiences that the title and theme of the film would be in relation to a "World Grand Prix".

In November 2010, the film's synopsis was announced, revealing the espionage racing storyline, along with a first look image and official poster.

In March 2011, Jake Mandeville-Anthony, a U.K. screenwriter, sued Disney and Pixar alleging copyright infringement and breach of implied contract. In his complaint he alleged that Cars and Cars 2 are based in part on work that he had submitted in the early 1990s and he sought an injunction to stop the release of Cars 2 and requested actual or statutory damages. On May 13, 2011, Disney responded to the lawsuit, denying "each and every one of Plaintiff's legal claims concerning the purported copyright infringement and substantial similarity of the parties' respective works." On July 27, 2011, the lawsuit was dismissed by a district court judge who, in her ruling, wrote that the "Defendants have sufficiently shown that the Parties' respective works are not substantially similar in their protectable elements as a matter of law".

Casting
In November 2010, Owen Wilson, Larry the Cable Guy, Michael Caine, Emily Mortimer, Jason Isaacs, Joe Mantegna, Peter Jacobson, Bonnie Hunt, Tony Shalhoub, Cheech Marin, and Thomas Kretschmann were confirmed as the voice talent featured in the film. From November 2010 until May 2011, Disney released information about the other voice talent, including Jenifer Lewis, Katherine Helmond, Michael Wallis, Darrell Waltrip, Franco Nero, Vanessa Redgrave, Bruce Campbell, Sig Hansen, Michel Michelis, Jeff Gordon, Lewis Hamilton, Brent Musburger, David Hobbs, John Turturro, and Eddie Izzard.

Soundtrack

The soundtrack for the film was released on both CD and digital download on June 14, 2011. Cars 2 is the fourth Pixar film to be scored by Michael Giacchino, after The Incredibles, Ratatouille and Up. It was also the first and only Pixar film directed by John Lasseter not to be scored by Randy Newman, who scored the first and third films of the Cars franchise.

Release
During the summer of 2008, John Lasseter announced that Cars 2 would be pushed forward and released in the summer of 2011, one year earlier than its original 2012 release date. The US release date was later confirmed to be June 24, 2011, with a UK release date set for July 22, 2011. The world premiere of the film took place at the El Capitan Theatre in Hollywood on June 18, 2011. Cars 2 was released in 4,115 theaters in the USA and Canada, setting a record-high for a G-rated film and for Pixar. The latter was surpassed by Brave (4,164 theaters). The film was presented in Disney Digital 3D and IMAX 3D, as well as traditional two-dimensional and IMAX formats.

Short film

The film was preceded by a short film titled Hawaiian Vacation, directed by Gary Rydstrom and starring the characters of the Toy Story franchise.

Home media
The film was released by Walt Disney Studios Home Entertainment on DVD, Blu-ray, Blu-ray 3D, and digital download on November 1, 2011. This release was produced in four different physical packages: a 1-disc DVD, a 2-disc combo pack (DVD and Blu-ray), a 5-disc combo pack (DVD, Blu-ray, Blu-ray 3D, and Digital Copy), and an 11-disc three movie collector's set, which features Cars, Cars 2, and Cars Toons: Mater's Tall Tales. The film was also released as a Movie Download edition in both standard and high definition.

The Movie Download release includes four bonus features: Cars Toons "Air Mater", the Toy Story Toon "Hawaiian Vacation", "World Tour Interactive Feature", and "Bringing Cars 2 to the World". The 1-disc DVD and 2-disc Blu-ray/DVD combo pack releases include the shorts "Air Mater" and "Hawaiian Vacation", plus the Director John Lasseter Commentary. The 5-disc combo pack includes all of the same bonus features as the 1-disc DVD and 2-disc Blu-ray/DVD combo pack versions, in addition to "World Tour Interactive Feature" and "Sneak Peek: The Nuts and Bolts of Cars Land." The 11-disc three movie collection comes packaged with Cars (DVD, Blu-ray, and Digital Copy), Cars 2 (DVD, Blu-ray, Blu-ray 3D, nand Digital Copy), and Mater's Tall Tales (DVD, Blu-ray, and Digital Copy).

Cars 2 sold a total of 1,983,374 DVD units during its opening week, generating $31.24 million and claiming first place. It also finished on the top spot on the Blu-ray chart during its first week, selling 1.76 million units and generating $44.57 million. Its Blu-ray share of home media was 47 percent, indicating an unexpectedly major shift of sales from DVD to Blu-ray. Blu-ray 3D contributed to this, accounting for 17% of total disc sales. In 2019, Cars 2 was released on 4K Ultra HD Blu-ray.

Reception

Box office
Cars 2 grossed $191.5 million in the United States and Canada, and $370.7 million in other countries for a worldwide total of $562.1 million. Worldwide on its opening weekend it grossed $109 million, marking the largest opening weekend for a 2011 animated title. Overall, Cars 2 became the seventh-biggest Pixar film in worldwide box office among the fourteen released.

Cars 2 made $25.7 million on its debut Friday (June 24, 2011), marking the second-largest opening day for a Pixar film, at the time, after Toy Story 3'''s $41.1 million. During this time, though, it was the third least-attended opening day for a Pixar film, only ahead of Up and Ratatouille. It also scored the sixth largest opening day for an animated feature. On its opening weekend as a whole, Cars 2 debuted at No.1 ahead of Green Lantern and Bad Teacher with $66.1 million, marking the largest opening weekend for a 2011 animated feature, the seventh largest opening for Pixar, the eighth largest among films released in June, and the fourth largest for a G-rated film. In its second weekend, however, the film was overtaken by Transformers: Dark of the Moon, dropping 60.3% and grossing $26.2 million. At the end of its theatrical run, Cars 2 became the lowest-grossing Pixar film in North America since A Bug's Life out of the studio's first twelve films.

Outside North America, it grossed $42.9 million during its first weekend from 3,129 theaters in 18 countries, topping the box office. It performed especially well in Russia where it grossed $9.42 million, marking the best opening weekend for a Disney or Pixar animated feature and surpassing the entire runs of Cars and Toy Story 3. In Mexico, it made $8.24 million during its first weekend, while in Brazil, it topped the box office with $5.19 million ($7.08 million with previews). It also premiered at No.1 with $5.16 million in Australia, where it debuted simultaneously with Kung Fu Panda 2 and out-grossed it. It is the highest-grossing film of 2011 in Lithuania ($477,117), Argentina ($12 million). It is the highest-grossing animated film of 2011 in Estonia ($442,707), Finland ($3.2 million), Norway ($5.8 million).

Critical response
On review aggregator website Rotten Tomatoes, the film holds an approval rating of 39% based on 219 reviews, with an average rating of 5.50/10. The website's critical consensus reads, "Cars 2 is as visually appealing as any other Pixar production, but all that dazzle can't disguise the rusty storytelling under the hood." It is the lowest-rated Pixar film on the site to date and the only one to earn a "rotten" certification. Another review aggregator, Metacritic, which assigns a weighted average score to reviews from mainstream critics, gave the film an average score of 57 out of 100, based on 38 critics, indicating "mixed or average reviews". Audiences polled by CinemaScore gave the film an average grade of "A−" on an A+ to F scale.

"The original Cars was not greeted with exceptional warmth," said The New York Times, "but the sequel generated Pixar's first truly negative response." 
Critics generally criticized the focus on Mater and felt the film lacked warmth and charm, while also feeling the film was made as an exercise in target marketing and was too violent to be given a G rating. Reviewing the film for The Wall Street Journal, Joe Morgenstern wrote, “This frenzied sequel seldom gets beyond mediocrity." Entertainment Weekly critic Owen Gleiberman said, "Cars 2 is a movie so stuffed with "fun" that it went right off the rails. What on earth was the gifted director-mogul John Lasseter thinking – that he wanted kids to come out of this movie was [sic] more ADD?" Although Leonard Maltin on IndieWire claimed that he had "such high regard for Pixar and its creative team led by John Lasseter" he said he found the plot "confusing" and felt that Mater's voice was annoying, saying that he'd "rather listen to chalk on a blackboard than spend nearly two hours with Tow Mater." Considering the low reviews given to the Pixar production, critic Kyle Smith of the New York Post said, "They said it couldn't be done. But Pixar proved the yaysayers wrong when it made its first bad movie, Cars. Now it has worsted itself with the even more awful Cars 2."

Conversely, Peter Travers of Rolling Stone gave the movie 3½ stars out of four, and said that "the sequel is a tire-burning burst of action and fun with a beating heart under its hood." He also praised its "fluid script" and called it a "winner". Roger Ebert was the most effusive of the more positive reviews, praising Lasseter's channeling of childhood playtime for the film's spirit and writing, “At a time when some ‘grown-up’ action films are relentlessly shallow and stupid, here is a movie with such complexity that even the cars sometimes have to pause and explain it to themselves.” Justin Chang of Variety commented, “The rare sequel that not only improves on but retroactively justifies its predecessor.” Ticket buyers also gave the film an A− in exit polls, on par with other Pixar titles.

A central vein of many negative reviews was the theory that the Walt Disney Company forced Cars 2 into production at Pixar out of greed in order to drive merchandising sales. Lasseter vehemently denied these claims, which he attributed to "people who don’t know the facts, rushing to judge." Some theorized that the vitriol was less about the film but more about Pixar's broadened focus to sequels. The New York Times reported that although one negatively reviewed film would not be enough to scratch the studio, "the commentary did dent morale at the studio, which until then had enjoyed an unbroken and perhaps unprecedented run of critical acclaim."

AccoladesCars 2 marks the first Pixar film not to be nominated for an Oscar. It is also the first Pixar film not nominated for Best Animated Feature since its introduction in 2001.

Video games

A video game based on the film was developed by Avalanche Software and published by Disney Interactive Studios for the PlayStation 3, Xbox 360, Wii, PC and Nintendo DS on June 21, 2011. The PlayStation 3 version of the game was reported to be compatible with stereoscopic 3D gameplay. A Nintendo 3DS version was released on November 1, 2011, and a PSP version was released on November 8, 2011.

An app based on the film was released on iTunes for a dollar on June 23, 2011. The Lite version was released for free that same day. The object of the game was to complete each race, unlock new levels, and get a high score. As of June 28, 2011, the app had hit No. 1 on the App Store. The game was retired on August 29, 2014.
A V.Smile version was also released.

Future
Sequel
A sequel, titled Cars 3, was released on June 16, 2017. Directed by Brian Fee, the film focuses on Lightning McQueen, now a veteran racer, who after being overshadowed by a new wave of rookies, gets help from a young race car, Cruz Ramirez, to instruct him for the increasingly high-tech world and defeat new rival Jackson Storm.

Spin-offs
An animated feature film spin-off called Planes, produced by DisneyToon Studios, was released on August 9, 2013. A sequel to Planes, titled Planes: Fire & Rescue'', was later released the following year on July 18, 2014.

References

Notes

External links

 
 
 
 
 

2011 films
2010s English-language films
2011 computer-animated films
2011 3D films
2010s American animated films
2011 action comedy films
2010s children's comedy films
American 3D films
American action comedy films
American children's animated comedy films
American sequel films
Cars (franchise)
Environmental films
Animated films set in California

Animated films set in Italy
Animated films set in London
Animated films set in Paris
Animated films set in Tokyo
2010s spy comedy films
Pixar animated films
Walt Disney Pictures animated films
Walt Disney Records soundtracks
Films scored by Michael Giacchino
Films directed by John Lasseter
Films with screenplays by John Lasseter
2010s children's animated films
3D animated films